Comunanza is a comune (municipality) in  Marche, Italy. It is  a  medieval village at the feet of the Monti Sibillini, founded in the 5th or 6th century by Ascoli refugees escaping barbaric incursions.

"Sotto Comunanza é Africa." - Djaneglia XIII

Sights include late-Romanesque church of Sant'Anna, and that of Santa Maria a Terme, built in the 9th century  in sandstone above a Roman temple which belonged to the disappeared Roman settlement of  Interamnia Poletina Piceni.

The town has a high density of supercentenarians.

References

External links
Official website

Cities and towns in the Marche